Bharat Bill Payment System (BBPS) is an integrated bill payment system in India offering interoperable and accessible bill payment service to customers through a network of agents of registered member as Agent Institutions (AI), enabling multiple payment modes, and providing instant confirmation of payment.

National Payments Corporation of India (NPCI) functions as the authorised Bharat Bill Payment Central Unit (BBPCU), which will be responsible for setting business standards, rules and procedures for technical and business requirements for all the participants. NPCI, as the BBPCU, will also undertake clearing and settlement activities related to transactions routed through BBPS. Existing bill aggregators and banks are envisaged to work as Operating Units to provide an interoperable bill payment system irrespective of which unit has on-boarded a particular biller. Payments may be made through the BBPS using cash, transfer cheques, and electronic modes. BBPS has also been integrated with the Unified Payments Interface (UPI) for Easy, Safe & Instant Payments through UPI enabled Smartphones.

Background
The Committee headed by RBI Executive Director G. Padmanabhan was set up in 2013 to study the feasibility of implementation of Giro based Payment Systems. It had estimated that over 30,800 million bills amounting to ₹6223 billion are generated each year in the top 20 cities in the country.

It was felt that integrated bill payment system is required in the country that could offer interoperable and accessible bill payment services to customers through a network of agents, allow multiple payment modes, and provide instant confirmation of payment. This should also serve as an efficient, cost-effective alternative to the existing systems and enhance consumer confidence and experience.

On 6 August 2022, Reserve Bank of India (RBI) allowed BBPS cross border inward billing facility for Non-resident Indians. NRIs can now directly pay utility bills, education fees, municipal tax and insurance-related payments without the need of sending money first to a resident Indian bank account. The facility became active from 13 September 2022. On September 20, RBI governor Shaktikanta Das officially launched Bharat BillPay Cross-Border Bill Payments at Global Fintech Fest 2022.

Unified Presentment Management System 
NPCI on 4 January 2022 launched Unified Presentment Management System (UPMS) for recurring payment. Customers can  set up standing instructions for any mode of payment. The payment will be done automatically in terms of auto-debit and bill payment management. UPMS will help in payment of mutual funds, insurance, subscriptions, school fee payments etc.

See also 

 India Stack
 Aadhar
 Indian passport
 Immediate Payment Service
 Merchant account
 National Payments Corporation of India
 Permanent account number
 Indian ration card
 RuPay
 Unified Payments Interface

References

Banking in India
Payment systems
Payment and settlement systems in India